Stephen Junior Froggatt (born 9 March 1973) is an English former professional footballer. His senior playing career lasted from 1991 until 2001, when he announced his retirement after failing to recover from injury.

Career

Aston Villa
Froggatt was born in Lincoln, Lincolnshire. Youth team coach Dave Richardson poached schoolboy player Froggatt from his old club Leicester. Froggatt began his career Aston Villa as a trainee, before turning professional and making his debut for the team in 1991. He truly established himself during the first Premier League season of 1992–93 as he made 21 appearances, scoring his first goal (against Crystal Palace) in the process, helping the club to end as runners-up. Villa won the League Cup in 1994 and although Froggatt was not part of the squad for the final he played in the semi-final first leg against Tranmere Rovers. He also won recognition from the England U21s, earning two caps during this season.

Wolverhampton Wanderers
Froggatt was sold to First Division Wolverhampton Wanderers in July 1994 for £1 million, where he linked up again with Graham Taylor, who had given him his YTS contract at Aston Villa. The winger played for four full seasons at Molineux as the club twice failed in the promotion play-offs. In total, he made 111 appearances for Wolves before being sold to a third West Midlands side, Coventry City.

Coventry City
Froggatt joined Premier League Coventry City for £1.9 million in October 1998, by coincidence making his debut against his first club. He was a first choice player throughout his time at Highfield Road and his form earned him a surprise call-up to Kevin Keegan's England national team squad in November 1999, over six years after his Under 21 appearances.

He went on to be an unused substitute for England in the first leg of the Euro 2000 qualifying Playoff match against Scotland on 13 November 1999 and also featured in the squad for the second leg and a friendly against Argentina in February 2000.

However, his playing career was suffered a fatal blow just days after being included in the England squad, as he was stretchered off after a horror tackle by Sunderland's Nicky Summerbee during a Premier League fixture on 12 February 2000. After trying to play on for a handful of further games, he underwent surgery on the injury in summer 2000. He spent the 2000–01 season on the sidelines trying to recover, but was forced to concede defeat and announced his retirement at the end of the season.

Post-retirement
Upon retiring, Froggatt became the press officer at Coventry City and now works as a  personal trainer and often appears on television and radio as a football summariser.

Career statistics

Honours
Aston Villa
League Cup: 1993–94

Individual
First Division PFA Team of the Year: 1996–97

References

External links

Interview

1973 births
Living people
Sportspeople from Lincoln, England
English footballers
Association football midfielders
Aston Villa F.C. players
Wolverhampton Wanderers F.C. players
Coventry City F.C. players
Premier League players
England under-21 international footballers
Footballers from Lincolnshire